Jean, Baron Stéphenne is a Belgian businessman. He studied chemistry and bioindustries and obtained an MSc degree at the Faculté universitaire des sciences agronomiques de Gembloux in 1972 and an MBA degree from the Université catholique de Louvain in 1982.

Jean Stéphenne joined SmithKline-RIT (now GlaxoSmithKline Biologicals) in 1974 as head of bacterial and viral vaccines production, he became vaccine production director in 1980. From 1981 to 1991, he served as vaccine plant director and R&D director. From 1988 to 1991, he was vice president of human vaccines research and development and production. From 1991 to 1998 he led the vaccines division, first as vice president and general manager, then senior vice president and general manager, until his appointment as president and general manager in 1998. Since 1998, Jean Stéphenne is president and general manager of GlaxoSmithKline Biologicals.

In 2001, Stéphenne was raised into the Belgian nobility by King Albert II and given the noble title Baron for life.

Since 2013, Jean Stéphenne is shareholder and chairman of OncoDNA.

Since September 2015 he was a member of the supervisory board of CureVac, a German biopharmaceutical company specialising in mRNA-based drugs. In April 2020, he was appointed as the chairman of the company.

References

External links
 Jean Stéphenne
 Biography on the GSK website

Barons of Belgium
Belgian businesspeople
Walloon people
Living people
Honorary Knights Commander of the Order of the British Empire
Year of birth missing (living people)